The 1992 Nations Cup was held in Gelsenkirchen November on 11–15. Medals were awarded in the disciplines of men's singles, ladies' singles, pair skating, and ice dancing.

Results

Men

Ladies

Pairs

Ice dancing

External links
 Skate Canada results

Nations Cup, 1992
Bofrost Cup on Ice